Carla Mounzer Rahal is a Bulgarian actress of Arab descent born in Dubai, UAE. Carla Rahal is mostly known for her roles in the "National Theater of Bulgaria". Carla is also a pop, R&B,  singer, songwriter and producer. She is best known for one of  Bulgaria's most popular songs Lie to Me  and I wish U.

She was born in Dubai, UAE, the daughter of Lebanese father Mounzer Rahal and Bulgarian mother Mariana Rahal. Her brother is Bashar Rahal, also an actor.

References

Living people
Bulgarian people of Lebanese descent
Bulgarian stage actresses
People from Dubai
1977 births
21st-century Bulgarian actresses
20th-century Bulgarian actresses
Bulgarian television actresses
Bulgarian film actresses